The 2023 Bruhat Bengaluru Mahanagara Palike (Greater Bengaluru City Corporation) election are to be held by December 2023 in all 243 wards of the Bruhat Bengaluru Mahanagara Palike. The elections, due in 2020, were delayed due to the process of ward delimitation.

Controversies 
The exercises of delimiting new ward and selecting a list of wards for reservation caused major delays.

Ward delimitation 
The ward delimitation process is meant to bring the size of BBMP wards further in line with the city's increasing population to ensure fairer democratic representation and provision of adequate funds for development. 

Despite arguing for the elections to be held off due to delays in completing the delimitation process, the Karnataka State Election Commission had been ordered by the Karnataka High Court in December 2020 to hold elections within the existing 198 wards. Soon after, the state government published the BBMP Act, 2020, which increased the number of wards to 243. The High Court ordered that polls be held in the existing 198 wards regardless, but the Supreme Court then stayed the matter on appeal from the state government. In May 2022, the Supreme Court directed the state government to hold the BBMP, observing that they would be seen as a precursor to the upcoming Assembly elections, and granted the state government's request seeking eight weeks to complete the delimitation of wards and finalise the reservation list.

The BBMP submitted the ward delimitation report on June 9, 2022, which was later notified by the state government. As the COVID-19 pandemic delayed the 2021 National Census, the delimitation process was done using outdated figures from the 2011 Census, which undercounted the population of Bengaluru in 2022 by 60%.

Reservation list 
The state government's list of wards to be reserved for women and members of Backwards Classes was called into question by opposition parties. The government, led by Chief Minister Basavaraj Bommai, was accused of delaying the polls in order to minimise their potentially negative impact of the Assembly elections scheduled for March. Petitioners before the High Court alleged that it arbitrarily manipulated reservation criteria in order to unfairly advantage the ruling party. The government said that it had used randomisation in order to arrive at the ward-wise reservation list.

On September 30, the Karnataka High Court directed the reservation list to be redone and finalised by November 30, 2022 and for elections to be held by December 31. The court declared that the state government had failed to satisfy the triple test norm mandated by the Supreme Court in the K Krishnamurthy case, which was a requirement for all local government elections intending to provide reserved seats for OBC categories. It further stated that the process of reservation of wards for women had been done in arbitrary manner, deliberately reserving a greater number of wards for women in constituencies held by opposing parties. However, political leaders from the JD(S) and Congress parties expressed doubts that the government would hold elections on time.

Schedule

References

2020s in Karnataka
2020s in Bangalore
Elections in Bangalore
B